Adele Kern real name Adele Kern-Klein (25 November 1901 – 6 May 1980) was a German operatic and operetta coloratura soprano. She was known for her technical perfection and joy of playing. From 1927 to 1935, she sang at the Salzburg Festival as well as at the state operas of Vienna, Berlin and Munich.

She was one of the impressive ranks of Austrian and German soprani leggeri who made international careers in the 1920s and 1930s, including Irma Beilke, Erna Berger, Irene Eisinger, Ria Ginster, Maria Ivogün, Fritzi Jokl and Lotte Schöne.

Life 
Born in Munich, Kern studied with the famous coloratura soprano Hermine Bosetti (1875–1936). The pupil followed the path and roles of her teacher - both at the opera houses of Munich and Vienna and as Ännchen and Zerbinetta.

She made her debut as early as 1924 at the Bavarian State Opera in Munich as Olympia in The Tales of Hoffmann. There are different indications about the duration of her engagement in Munich. She was the first coloratura soprano to move to the Städtische Opernhaus in Frankfurt, where she had a contract until 1928. There, the ambitious conductor Clemens Krauss was artistic director from 1924 to 1929, and Lothar Wallerstein acted as principal conductor. The two created a new, production-oriented musical theatre in Frankfurt and took care of the musical and dramatic development of the young singer. Kern was to be regarded as a Clemens Krauss singer for many years (and she later worked at the state operas of Vienna, Berlin and Munich during his time as director). In Frankfurt she was already able to acquire numerous roles of her later very extensive role repertoire. In February 1926 she was also involved in the premiere of an opera by Bernhard Sekles.

In 1927, she undertook a major South American tour. as well as in ten performances of Marcelline in Fidelio, embodied 38 times Adele in Die Fledermaus, sang - besides Zerbinetta - 5 times Fiakermilli, 6 times one of the maids in Elektra and 40 times Sophie in Der Rosenkavalier.

From 1928, she had her greatest success in Vienna as the maid Yvonne in 19 performances of Krenek's so-called jazz opera Jonny spielt auf, which was later banned by Nazi Germany as degenerate music, and in 1930 as Angelina in Rossini's La Cenerentola with Koloman von Pataky as her partner. She sang this role 25 times in Vienna. However, she also distinguished herself as a Verdi singer - 18 times Gilda, 16 times Oscar - and in the late romantic-veristic subject - 17 times Lucieta in Ermanno Wolf-Ferrari's I quatro rusteghi and 19 times Nuri in d'Albert's Tiefland. She could also be seen and heard in the State Opera in operettas by Heuberger, Lehár and Millöcker.

This performance was conducted by Clemens Krauss, who had taken over the direction of the Staatsoper in 1929, and staged by Lothar Wallerstein, who had accompanied Krauss from Frankfurt to Vienna. However, Wallerstein had to emigrate in 1938 due to Nazi racial laws and finally continued his career at the New York Metropolitan Opera.

Salzburg Festival 
On 6 August 1927 her debut at the Salzburg Festival followed, under the musical direction of Robert Heger, as Susanna in The Marriage of Figaro. Furthermore she took over the roles of Marzelline and Zerlina in the reprises of Fidelio and Don Giovanni.

In 1929 she returned to Salzburg - as Zerlina and Sophie - and was then engaged by the Salzburg Festival until 1935. Don Giovanni was conducted by the outgoing Vienna State Opera Director Franz Schalk, the Rosenkavalier his successor and her mentor from Frankfurt, Clemens Krauss. In the following years Kern again sang Zerlina (1930), Susanna and Sophie (both 1930-35) in Salzburg, as well as Despina in Così fan tutte for the first time (1931 to 1934|1931-32 and 1934-35). She also appeared there as a concert singer.

Parallel to her engagements in Vienna and Salzburg, she developed a lively guest performance activity. In 1929 and 1931 she took part in two exemplary Max Reinhardt productions in Berlin: as Adele in the Fledermaus (at the Deutsches Theater) and as Olympia in The Tales of Hoffmann (at the Großes Schauspielhaus). In 1931 and 1933 she was a guest at the Royal Opera House Covent Garden in London, where her Sophie was especially admired in the Rosenkavalier. In 1933 she took over the role of Hannerl Krüger in Voices of Spring, a feature film by Pál Fejös. At the Berlin Theater des Westens in December of the same year she took part in the premiere of Eduard Künneke's Singspiel Die lockende Flamme. She gave guest performances at the Milan Scala and at the Teatro dell'Opera di Roma, in Paris, Venice and Rio de Janeiro. She also undertook a successful tour of Egypt.

Berlin and Munich 
Like Julius Patzak and Viorica Ursuleac, Kern followed the conductor and director Clemens Krauss first to the Staatsoper Unter den Linden in Berlin in 1935 and then to the Bayerische Staatsoper in Munich in 1937. There, in her hometown, the artist achieved extraordinary popularity due to her razor-sharp coloratura, the silvery tone of her voice and the unusual brilliance of her performance. In Munich, Kern also sang her signature roles in operas by Mozart and Richard Strauss, including Sophie and Zerbinetta.

The singer's involvement in NS cultural policy is not known. In July 1944, however, she gave a guest performance as Zerbinetta in Krakow in a new production of Ariadne auf Naxos ordered by Governor General Hans Frank.

At the age of 46 she had to retire from the stage because of a heart condition. She died in 1980 and was buried at Ostfriedhof in Munich.

Roles

World premieres 
 1926: Die zehn Küsse by Bernhard Sekles – Oper Frankfurt (25 February)
 1930: Das Veilchen von Montmartre by Emmerich Kálmán – Johann Strauß-Theater, Vienna (21 March)
 1931: Endlich allein by Franz Lehár – Theater an der Wien (6 December)
 1933: Die lockende Flamme by Eduard Künneke – Theater des Westens (27 December)
 1934: Fanny in Bittner's Das Veilchen – Wiener Staatsoper, conductor: Clemens Krauss (8 December)

Repertoire 

Sources for the roles of her repertoire:Archiv der Wiener Staatsoper: Vorstellungen mit Adele Kern, retrieved on 9 December 2019.

Filmography 
 1934: Voices of Spring by Pál Fejös – as Hannerl Krüger

Recording 
Recordings on Parlophon, Polydor and Vox. Numerous recordings of opera scenes from the Vienna State Opera were issued on Koch Records.

 Complete recordings
 Johann Strauß': Die Fledermaus (1929), conductor: Weigert – Role: Adele R. Strauss: Der Rosenkavalier conductor: Clemens Krauss (1940 or 1944, Vox) – Sophie

 Arias
 Durch Zärtlichkeit und Schmeicheln from Mozart's: Die Entführung aus dem Serail – Blondchen
 Laßt ab mit Fragen from Verdi's Un ballo in maschera – Oscar

 Lieder
 Die Nachtigall by Aljabjew – auf Schellack
 Der Vogel im Walde by Taubert – auf Schellack

 Sampler
 Lebendige Vergangenheit: Adele Kern, Classica Lirica Recital, Preiser Records (PRE 89586)

Further reading 
 Josef Kaut: Die Salzburger Festspiele 1920–1981, Mit einem Verzeichnis der aufgeführten Werke und der Künstler des Theaters und der Musik von Hans Jaklitsch, Salzburg: Residenz Verlag 1982, .
 Jürgen Kesting: Die großen Sänger, volume 2, Hamburg: Hoffmann und Campe 2008, ; Mentions also on p. 1129 and in volume 3 .
 Karl-Josef Kutsch, Leo Riemens: Großes Sängerlexikon. 4th edition. volume 7. Saur, Munich 2003, 
 Erich Scheibmayr: Letzte Heimat, Persönlichkeiten in Münchner Friedhöfen 1784–1984, Munich: Scheibmayr Verlag 1985 (nicht eingesehen)

References

External links 
 
 Cantabile Subito, ausführliche Biographie Adele Kerns mit einer Reihe von Porträt- und Szenenbildern (englisch)
 Kern Adele on OPERISSIMO
 Adele Kern Tondokumente bei vocalclassics.com
 

German operatic sopranos
1901 births
1980 deaths
Musicians from Munich
20th-century German women opera singers